= Sports Media 101 =

- Owners: Independently Owned (Bloguin, Inc.)
- Website: Sportsmedia101.com
- Registration: Optional
- Launched: 2011 (Officially), 2004 (Unofficially)

Sports Media 101 is an American digital media company based in New York that consists of a network of websites that cover professional and college

level sports teams, including football, baseball, basketball, and hockey. The company, also known as SM101, specializes in creating sports news content on an individual team basis.

== History ==
Sports Media 101 was officially founded in 2011 by Dan Benton and Pieter VanIperen. However, the company has been growing since 2004 when Giants101, the first and flagship site in the network, was launched.

In June 2017, Sports Media 101 was acquired by Bloguin, Inc. a sports fan website formed in 2008. Bloguin also runs the Sports Daily, established in 2008, which is a collection of over 100 blogs. The site covers a variety of different sports leagues including the NFL, NBA, MLB, NHL, UFC, English Premier League, Major League Soccer and the NCAA. In connection with this acquisition, SM 101 is its own entity as an additional property under the Bloguin umbrella which further aims to feature the perfect mix of original content and aggregated news to keep readers informed.

== Network Format ==
The network is divided into individual segments that each cover a specific major league or college level sports team such as Yankees101 for the New York Yankees, Knicks101 for the New York Knicks, Eagles101 for the Philadelphia Eagles, and Kings101 for the Los Angeles Kings. The article content is compiled from a constant stream of sports news coverage in a centralized location. This platform is an interactive space to enhance originality, customization and digital marketing offerings whereby users and partners experience an integrated digital media partnership through their own dedicated media arm.

== Sponsorship Format ==
Sports Media 101 follows a unique sponsorship format in that each individual site within the network is corporate sponsored. The site and all of its social media accounts are cobranded for both the team site and corporate sponsor, allowing for consistent and daily exposure to the target audience without the use of banner advertising
